Duttweiler is a Swiss surname. Notable people with this surname include

 Adele Duttweiler (1892–1990), Swiss women and philanthropist, wife of Gottlieb Duttweiler
 Gottlieb Duttweiler (1888–1962), Swiss businessman and politician, founder of the Migros group
Gottlieb Duttweiler Institute in Switzerland
 Werner Duttweiler (born 1939), Swiss athlete

German-language surnames